Eupithecia violetta is a moth in the family Geometridae. It is found in Mexico.

The wingspan is about 26 mm. The forewings are violet-grey, with a brown tinge toward the costa. The lines are black. The hindwings have a central black line, running from the inner margin to the lower end of the cell.

References

Moths described in 1906
violetta
Moths of Central America